Erich Schöppner (25 June 1932 – 12 September 2005) was a German boxer. He competed in the men's light middleweight event at the 1952 Summer Olympics.

References

External links
 

1932 births
2005 deaths
German male boxers
Olympic boxers of Germany
Boxers at the 1952 Summer Olympics
People from Witten
Sportspeople from Arnsberg (region)
Light-middleweight boxers